Sandro Orrù (born January 8, 1968), known as DJ Gruff, Gruffetti or Lowdy N.C.N., is a pioneer of the Italian Hip Hop scene. Known for his original take on rapping and scratching techniques since 1982, DJ Gruff has been active on the Hip Hop scene in Italy as a turntablist, DJ, beatmaker, rapper and producer.

Biography
DJ Gruff has been a member of a number of groups/collectives/crews such as The place to be (Next One, Carrie D, Igor, Nando- Boogie and Mr Hyde), Casino Royale (Alioscia Bisceglia, Giuliano Palma, Michele Pauli, Ferdinando Masi etc), Radical Stuff (DJ Skizo, Soul Boy, Sean, Top Cat and Kaos One), Isola Posse All Stars, and was among the founders of Sangue Misto (DJ Gruff, Neffa and Deda) recording with them the album SxM, universally acknowledged as a milestone of Italian Hip Hop. DJ Gruff’s musical production is vast, including collaborations with musicians, MCs, breakers, and street artists from all over the world. Since 1996 he has been collaborating with Alien Army, the collective representing the greatest turntable talents in Italy.

Career 
DJ Gruff was born in Rome on 8/1/1968 to Sardinian parents and started spinning vinyl in 1982. A great fan of mixing on more than two turntables he immediately started scratching. One year later he discovered Hip Hop and breaking became his obsession. In 1984 his improvised, irreverent rap exclusively in Italian and Italian dialects, started to become popular, thanks to the breakers he was meeting. During a few nights in local venues in Torino he developed a new approach to playing music: an endless series of mixtapes with extreme scratching sessions conducted on a mixer built for other purposes. Customized switches - half melted on a flame -, extremely long slides and unsuitable needles could not stop his desire to develop the kind of instrument that in time would become the most popular in the world. In 1986 he become part of the Hip Hop scene in Milan and very quickly his particular touch on vinyl became well known, and he started working with Casino Royale (with Alioscia Bisceglia, Giuliano Palma, Michele Pauli, Ferdinando Masi etc) and Radical Stuff (with DJ Skizo, Soul Boy, Sean, Top Cat and Kaos One). During those years he featured in a huge number of jam sessions. One night DJ Ringo, well-known performer in one of Milan’s top clubs, asked him to play music at a party organized for unequalled ensemble The J.B.’s (James Brown band) and from that moment DJing became his reason to live. During the early 90s DJ Gruff moved to Bologna to work with a crossover, raggarock band; two years later from that setup the Sangue Misto ensemble was born (DJ Gruff, Neffa and Deda). Their studio album, SxM, released in 1994 by the Century Vox label is still considered a milestone of Italian Hip Hop. Later all three artists would pursue separate solo projects. In 1995 Gruff moved to Puglia where he lived for three years studying the ancient rhythms of Salento. In 2001 he moved to Japan where he took his turntable techniques to a whole new level. This brought him to produce Frikkettonism, an eccentric album produced, mixed and printed in Tokyo. The album comes out in the Double H Vinyls series in 1000 hand-numbered copies in double gatefold vinyl, of which the first 600 in marbled transparent blue vinyl. From the early 80s his rapping style has developed in his records into his characteristic and unmistakable syllabic-reasoning style. In 2014, a meeting with the greatest contemporary trombone player, Gianluca Petrella, resulted in a fruitful collaboration exploring an experimental vision where Rap, Hip hop, Scratching and Jazz meet in an intense and totally unprejudiced partnership. In 2019 the album "August11th" by DJ Gruff & RayZa was released, produced with Gianluca Petrella feat. Reggie Reg from Crash Crew, Grandmaster Caz, Grand Wizzard Theodore, Sadat X, Ekspo, Kemar Williams, Ramtzu, Uomodisu, Antonio Tarantino, Diego Martino, Allien Army and 2ph13b. The album “August 11th” is a homage to Hip-Hop culture, born in the Bronx on 11 August 1973 when Kool Herc organized at 1520 Sedgwick Avenue (Bronx, New York) what is considered the first Hip Hop party in history. Every track on the record features lyrics by RayZa set to music composed by Sandro Orrù a.k.a. Dj Gruff and Gianluca Petrella who with turntables, synths and trombone created their own interpretation of the movement established by legendary pioneers such as  Reggie Reg from Crash Crew, Grandmaster Caz, Grand Wizzard Theodore who along with Hip Hop giant Sadat X all feature on the album.

The following albums will be released in 2020:

“Lcdb” by DJ Gruff & Antonio Tarantino feat. Gianluca Petrella, Diego Martino and Roberto Chiga.

“Passi” by DJ Gruff & Gianluca Petrella feat. Petra Magoni, Antonio Tarantino, Diego Martino and Roberto Chiga.

Articolo 31 controversy
In 1998 DJ Gruff wrote the song 1 vs 2,  a verbal assault against Articolo 31, a fellow Italian rap band. Articolo 31 successfully took him to court and had the song pulled off from Gruff's album Il Suono Della Strada.

Discography

 Rapadopa (1993)
 Zero Stress (1997)
 Il Suono Della Strada (1998)
 O Tutto O Niente (1999)
 Tiffititaff (2002)
 Svarioni Premeditati (2002)
 Karasau Kid (2002)
 Pecorino Sardo (2003)
 Scientific Experiment (2003)
 Lowdy '82 / '03 (2003)
 Frikkettonism (2004)
 Uno (2005)
 Sandro O.B. (2008)
 Phonogruff (2010)
August 11 (2019)

External links
Official website
official DJ Gruff mixtape www.mixcloud.com/lowdygruff/
 English translation of the '1vs2' lyrics

References
 

Living people
Italian rappers
People from Sardinia
1968 births